Shelly Bartlett (born April 21, 1965), now Shelly Sweeney , is an American former professional tennis player.

Bartlett, a California native, played collegiate tennis for the University of Colorado and UC Berkeley during the 1990s. 

On the professional tour, Bartlett had a best singles ranking of 542 and qualified for her only WTA Tour singles main draw at the 1990 Singapore Open. She was ranked as high as 176 in the world for doubles.

Her elder sister, Lindsay Bartlett, also played on the professional tour.

ITF finals

Doubles: 1 (1–0)

References

External links
 
 

1965 births
Living people
American female tennis players
Colorado Buffaloes women's tennis players
California Golden Bears women's tennis players
Tennis people from California